Miss Jojo or Jojo Mukherjee is a singer cum actress who hails from Kolkata, West Bengal. Jojo is from a musical family, where her father, Mrinal Mukherjee, is a popular singer and actor. Her mother, Shibani Mukherjee, was also a singer. Jojo Mukherjee's mom used to take her to her concerts and Jojo made her debut in the concerts at the age of 6. When she was 15 years, Jojo became a notable personality, singing in concerts. Besides singing in the concerts and stage shows, Jojo had crooned some jingles. Jojo did her schooling at the South Point High School in Kolkata. Geeta Ghatak and Deepali Nag were her initial trainers. It was Deepali Nag who suggested Jojo concentrate on light music. In 1993, she made her acting debut in Duranta Prem along with Rachna Banerjee and Tapas Pal. In her latest interview, Jojo stated that today's singers have got a lot of privileges than the singers in the 90s. Media helps them much to develop their career, added Jojo. Jojo Mukherjee balances her professional and personal lives. She attends concerts, sings for movies and also manages the home. Jojo is married and has two children, a daughter and a son. Jojo's advice to aspiring singers is, if anyone wants to become a playback singer, they have to listen and practice various genres, from ghazals to trendy movie songs. She had also made a short film, Silence.

References

Bengali singers
Living people
1975 births
Women musicians from West Bengal
Indian musicians